Aleksandra Franciszka Sikora (born 7 February 1991) is a Polish footballer who plays as a defender or midfielder for Norwegian club Klepp IL and the Poland national team.

Personal life
Sikora was born in Kędzierzyn-Koźle, from which she moved out at the age of nine. Works as a football trainer at a school in Konin and has a UEFA B coaching license.

Club career
Sikora's career begun at Promień Mosty, a club near Goleniów, where she played in the women's team at the Inne Ligi Kobiet (third division). Her studies brought her to Konin and eventually to Medyk Konin, where she first played as a forward in the 1. Liga (second division). At the age of 16 she scored a hat-trick in four consecutive league matches. Sikora went on play in the Ekstraliga (first division) and the UEFA Women's Champions League with the club. Despite her goalscoring ability, coach Roman Jaszczak first moved her to right midfield, and then coach Nina Patalon decided to play her as a defender.

On 13 July 2018, Sikora joined Serie A club Juventus.

International career
Sikora mainly plays as a defender for the Poland national team. She scored her first goal on 12 February 2014, during a friendly match against Luxembourg. Sikora is the captain of the team since 2014.

International goals

References

External links
 Player Polish domestic and international stats at PZPN 
 

1991 births
Living people
People from Goleniów County
Sportspeople from West Pomeranian Voivodeship
Polish women's footballers
Poland women's international footballers
Medyk Konin players
Women's association football defenders
Women's association football midfielders
Juventus F.C. (women) players
Expatriate women's footballers in Italy
Serie A (women's football) players
Polish expatriate sportspeople in Italy
A.C.F. Brescia Calcio Femminile players